Sir Nicholas Roger Warren (born 20 May 1949), styled The Hon. Mr Justice Warren, is a judge of the High Court of England and Wales.

He was educated at Bryanston School and University College, Oxford.

He was called to the bar at Middle Temple in 1972 and made a bencher there in 2001. He was made a QC in 1993, recorder 1999 to 2005, and judge of the High Court of Justice (Chancery Division) since 2005.

References

1949 births
Living people
People educated at Bryanston School
Alumni of University College, Oxford
Members of the Middle Temple
Chancery Division judges
Knights Bachelor